Roy Robert Fernandez  (28 January 19282 May 2014) was an Australian public servant and diplomat.

Fernandez was born on 12 January 1928 in Melbourne, Victoria.

In January 1970, Fernandez was appointed Ambassador to Yugoslavia. Then Minister for External Affairs William McMahon announced in March 1970 that Fernandez would also be accredited to Romania during his posting to Belgrade.

In 1971, Fernandez was appointed Minister in the Australian Embassy in Washington DC. Staff at the post numbered around 350.

In March 1980 Fernandez was appointed Ambassador to Belgium.

Fernandez took up an appointment as Ambassador to the Philippines in November 1982. In the Philippines, Fernandez was outspoken about the bad state of the country's economy.

References

1928 births
2014 deaths
Ambassadors of Australia to Belgium
Ambassadors of Australia to Myanmar
Ambassadors of Australia to the Philippines
Ambassadors of Australia to Yugoslavia
Officers of the Order of Australia